This is a list of the historical districts or härader in the province of Småland, Sweden. Each district was also subdivided into congregations.

Provincial Districts in Kronoberg 
Allbo
Kinnevald
Konga
Sunnerbo
Norrvidinge
Uppvidinge

Provincial Districts in the County of Kalmar 
Aspeland
Hanbörd
Norra Möre
Södra Möre
Sevede
Stranda
Norra Tjust
Södra Tjust
Tuna län

Provincial Districts in the County of Jönköping 
Bellö
Edshult
Eksjö
Flisby
Hult
Hässleby
Höreda
Ingatorp
Mellby
Mo
Norra Solberga
Tveta
Vista
Vedbo
Norra Vedbo
Västbo
Östbo
Västra
Östra

See also
 Kronoberg County
 Kalmar County
 Jönköping County

Småland
Districts of Småland